Everything's Jake is a 2000 drama film distributed by Warner Bros.  The movie marks the feature writing and directorial debut of Matthew Miele, along with his producing/writing partner, Chris Fetchko.  Aside from the film title referring to the main character, it is also a slang expression from the Roaring Twenties in the United States, meaning "everything is in good order".

Plot
Within the most storied city in the world lives Jake (Ernie Hudson), a homeless man who calls all of Manhattan his home.  Jake discovers Cameron (Graeme Malcolm), a man down on his luck and sleeping in a tree in Central Park.

Taking Cameron under his wing, Jake teaches him how to survive on the streets.  Jake's friendship with Cameron winds up threatening Jake's way of life, a life no one ever thought could possibly exist, lived with heart and spirit, and a charming embrace of the city.  In this heartwarming and beautifully-shot film, homelessness is shown in a new light, illustrated with a stellar performance by Ernie Hudson, alongside a number of star-studded cameos.

Cast
Ernie Hudson as Jake
Graeme Malcolm as Cameron
Willis Burks as Colonel
Phyllis Diller as Misty
Doug E. Doug as Taxicab Driver
Stephen Furst as Assistant Librarian
Robin Givens as Publisher
Lou Myers as Abe
Lou Rawls as Hot Dog Vendor
Debbie Allen as Librarian

Critical reception
"Ernie Hudson delivers a consummately warm and satisfying performance." — Variety

Film festivals/awards
2000 Atlantic City Film Festival — Grand Prize — Full Feature
2000 Santa Barbara International Film Festival — Burning Vision Award — Special Mention
2006 Big Apple Film Festival — Festival Prize — Best Feature

External links
Official Site

DVD Review from Moving Pictures Magazine
DVD Review from The Trades

2000 films
American independent films
2000 drama films
Warner Bros. films
2000 directorial debut films
2000s English-language films
2000s American films